Harald Johannes Gjein (born 3 June 1955 in Stokke) is a Norwegian veterinarian and civil servant, and the current director-general of the Norwegian Food Safety Authority. He was appointed by the King-in-Council on 15 April 2011 and took office on 1 June 2011, succeeding Joakim Lystad.

He graduated as a veterinarian at the Norwegian School of Veterinary Science in 1980, and holds a dr.scient. degree from 1994, with the dissertation Housing of pregnant sows: a field study on health and welfare, with special emphasis on claw lesions. He was CEO of the swine producers' association Norsvin from 2000 to 2007 and deputy director of the Norwegian Veterinary Institute 2007–2009 and director 2009–2011.

References

1955 births
Living people
People from Stokke
Norwegian School of Veterinary Science alumni
Norwegian civil servants
Directors of government agencies of Norway
Norwegian veterinarians